The Deposition is a 1634 painting by the Flemish artist Anthony van Dyck. It is now in the Alte Pinakothek in Munich. The artist had already treated the same subject on at least two other occasions, in 1615 and 1619.

References

Religious paintings by Anthony van Dyck
Collection of the Alte Pinakothek
1634 paintings
Paintings of the Descent from the Cross
Paintings of the Virgin Mary
Angels in art